GPUOpen is a middleware software suite originally developed by AMD's Radeon Technologies Group that offers advanced visual effects for computer games.  It was released in 2016.  GPUOpen serves as an alternative to, and a direct competitor of Nvidia GameWorks. GPUOpen is similar to GameWorks in that it encompasses several different graphics technologies as its main components that were previously independent and separate from one another. However, GPUOpen is entirely open source software, unlike GameWorks which is proprietary and closed.

History

GPUOpen was announced on December 15, 2015, and released on January 26, 2016.

Rationale 
Nicolas Thibieroz, AMD's Senior Manager of Worldwide Gaming Engineering, argues that "it can be difficult for developers to leverage their R&D investment on both consoles and PC because of the disparity between the two platforms" and that "proprietary libraries or tools chains with "black box" APIs prevent developers from accessing the code for maintenance, porting or optimizations purposes". He says that upcoming architectures, such as AMD's RX 400 series "include many features not exposed today in PC graphics APIs".

AMD designed GPUOpen to be a competing open-source middleware stack released under the MIT License. The libraries are intended to increase software portability between video game consoles, PCs and also High-performance computing.

Components 
GPUOpen unifies many of AMD's previously separate tools and solutions into one package, also fully open-sourcing them under the MIT License.  GPUOpen also makes it easy for developers to get low-level GPU access.

Additionally AMD wants to grant interested developers the kind of low-level "direct access" to their GCN-based GPUs, that surpasses the possibilities of Direct3D 12 or Vulkan. AMD mentioned e.g. a low-level access to the Asynchronous Compute Engines (ACEs). The ACE implement "Asynchronous Compute", but they cannot be freely configured under either Vulkan or Direct3D 12.

GPUOpen is made up of several main components, tools, and SDKs.

Games and CGI 
Software for computer-generated imagery (CGI) used in development of computer games and movies alike.

Visual effects libraries

FidelityFX

FidelityFX Super Resolution 

FidelityFX Super Resolution (FSR) is used to upsample an input image into a higher resolution. There are two versions of FSR with distinctive upscaling technique and image quality. FSR 1 is a spatial upscaler based on the Lanczos algorithm requiring an anti aliased lower resolution image, meanwhile FSR 2 is a temporal upscaler based on a modified Lanczos requiring an aliased lower resolution image and utilising the temporal data (such as motion vectors and frame history) and then applies its own anti aliasing pass which replaces the game's temporal anti-aliasing solution. The standard presets for FSR by AMD can be found in the table below. Note that these presets are not the only way in which the algorithm can be used, they are simply presets for input/output resolutions. Certain titles, such as Dota 2 have offered resolution sliders to fine tune the scaling percentage or dynamically scaling the internal render resolution depending on the FPS cap.

FSR 2 can also be modded into nearly any game supporting DLSS by swapping the DLSS DLL with a translation layer DLL that maps the DLSS API calls to FSR 2 API calls.

Tools 
The official AMD directory lists:

Having been released by ATI Technologies under the BSD license in 2006 HLSL2GLSL is not part of GPUOpen. Whether similar tools for SPIR-V will be available remains to be seen, as is the official release of the Vulkan (API) itself. Source-code that has been defined as being part of GPUOpen is also part of the Linux kernel (e.g. amdgpu and amdkfd), Mesa 3D and LLVM.

Software development kits

Professional Compute 

As of 2022, AMD compute software ecosystem is regrouped under the ROCm metaproject.

Software around Heterogeneous System Architecture (HSA), General-Purpose computing on Graphics Processing Units (GPGPU) and High-Performance Computing (HPC)

Radeon Open Compute (ROCm) 

AMD's "Boltzmann Initiative" (named after Ludwig Boltzmann) was announced in November 2015 at the SuperComputing15 and productized as the Radeon Open Compute platform (ROCm). It aims to provide an alternative to Nvidia's CUDA which includes a tool to port CUDA source-code to portable (HIP) source-code which can be compiled on both HCC and NVCC.

 Radeon Open Compute Kernel (ROCK) driver
 Radeon Open Compute Runtime (ROCR) runtime
 HCC: Heterogeneous Compute Compiler
 HIP: C++ Heterogeneous-Compute Interface for Portability

Heterogeneous System Architecture 

 HSAIL-GDB: provides an GNU Debugger-based debugging environment for HSA Intermediate Layer (HSAIL)
 HSA Runtime APIs
 Linux amdkfd v1.6.1 release for Kaveri & Carrizo

Various  
 clFFT library for Fast Fourier transform written in OpenCL
 hcFFT library for Fast Fourier transform written in HCC-optimized C++

Availability
GPUOpen are available under the MIT license to the general public through GitHub starting on January 26, 2016.

There is interlocking between GPUOpen and well established and widespread free software projects, e.g. Linux kernel, Mesa 3D and LLVM.

See also
 ROCm
 AMD CodeXL
 Mantle
 Vulkan

References

External links
 
 List of games that support high-fidelity upscaling - List moved from Wikipedia to PCGamingWiki

AMD software
Free and open-source software
Linux software
Software using the MIT license
Windows software